Kiss is the ninth studio album by German band Bad Boys Blue. It was released on 27 September 1993 by Coconut Records. One single was also released. John McInerney performed "Kiss You All Over, Baby" which before had been sung by Trevor Taylor. The song "Save Your Love" from the previous album was performed here as "Aguarda Tu Amor" in Spanish. The song "Kisses And Tears" is taken from the second album.

This record was the last with Trevor Bannister. In 1993, Bad Boys Blue toured around Africa with singer Owen Standing who never was an official band member.

Track listing
"Kiss You All Over, Baby" – 4:22   
"Sooner or Later" – 3:42   
"Kisses and Tears (My One and Only)" – 3:55   
"The Woman I Love" – 3:35   
"I Do It All for You, Baby" – 3:35   
"I Live" – 4:06   
"Heart of Midnight" – 3:50   
"Where Have You Gone" – 3:30   
"Aguarda Tu Amor (Save Your Love)" – 3:58   
"I'm Still in Love" – 3:52   
"I Totally Miss You (U.S. Remix)" – 4:50

Personnel
Bad Boys Blue
John McInerney
Andrew Thomas
Trevor Bannister
Lead Vocals – Andrew Thomas (tracks: 4), John McInerney (tracks: 1, 2, 7 to 11), Trevor Bannister (tracks: 5), Trevor Taylor (tracks: 3, 6)

Additional personnel
Engineer – Gary Jones, Helmut Rüssmann 
Lyrics By – Andrew Thomas (tracks: 6), John McInerney (tracks: 6), Karin van Haaren (tracks: 1 to 5, 7 to 11), Manuel Perez-Leal (tracks: 9), Mary Applegate (tracks: 3), Trevor Taylor (tracks: 6) 
Music By – Karin van Haaren (tracks: 6), T. Hendrik 
Producers – Tony Hendrik and Karin Hartmann

References

External links
ALBUM - Kiss
Bad Boys Blue – General Information

1993 albums
Bad Boys Blue albums